Edward Aloysius Mooney (May 9, 1882 – October 25, 1958) was an American cardinal of the Roman Catholic Church. He served as Archbishop of Detroit from 1937 until his death, and was made a cardinal in 1946.

Early life and ministry
Edward Mooney was born in Mount Savage, Maryland, as the seventh child of Thomas and Sarah (née Heneghan) Mooney. At age 5, he moved with his family to Youngstown, Ohio, where his father worked at a tube mill. Following his father's death in the 1890s, his mother opened a small bakery to support the family, with Edward and his siblings delivering the baked goods to her customers. He attended St. Charles College in Ellicott City and St. Mary's Seminary in Baltimore before being sent to Rome in 1905 to study at the Pontifical North American College. He was ordained to the priesthood by Cardinal Pietro Respighi on April 10, 1909.

Upon his return to the United States, Mooney taught dogmatic theology at St. Mary's Seminary in Cleveland until 1916. He was the founding principal of the Cathedral Latin School in Cleveland from 1916 to 1922, and pastor of St. Patrick's Church in Youngstown from 1922 to 1923. Returning to Rome, he then became spiritual director of the North American College in 1923. Albert Meyer, a student at the North American College and future cardinal, once said, "[Mooney] was revered and greatly beloved ... he left an indelible mark on all the students, inspiring them with his great learning and his solid spiritual guidance." He was raised to the rank of domestic prelate of his holiness on June 3, 1925.

Episcopal career

Apostolic delegate
On January 21, 1926, after having made a favorable impression on Cardinal Pietro Gasparri, Mooney was appointed Apostolic Delegate to India and Titular Archbishop of Irenopolis in Isauria by Pope Pius XI. He received his episcopal consecration on the following January 31 from Cardinal Willem van Rossum, CSSR, with Archbishop Francesco Marchetti Selvaggiani and Bishop Giulio Serafini serving as co-consecrators. During his tenure in Bangalore, fifteen missions and three dioceses were created and the Syro-Malankara Church was reconciled with the Holy See.

Mooney was later named Apostolic Delegate to Japan on March 30, 1931. At the time of his arrival, all Japanese were required to visit and pay homage at Shinto shrines, with Catholics objecting to participation in Shinto worship. Mooney led a successful effort for the Japanese government to declare that visits to the shrines were only of a patriotic nature and not a religious one. He later presided over a plenary council of the Korean bishops.

Bishop of Rochester
Being recalled from Tokyo to the United States, he was appointed the fourth Bishop of Rochester, with the personal title of "archbishop", on August 28, 1933. Mooney was elected chairman of the National Catholic Welfare Conference, the predecessor of the United States Conference of Catholic Bishops, shortly afterwards in 1935; he maintained that post until 1945. During his tenure in Rochester, he promoted Catholic Action and the Knights of Peter Claver as a means of outreach to the African American community, and took deep interest in Catholic social teaching and labor relations. He would also play golf in high temperatures (once saying, "If your score is over 100, you are neglecting your golf—if it falls below 90, you're neglecting your parish") and take a group of altar boys every year to the opening game of the baseball season.

Archbishop of Detroit
Mooney was named the first Archbishop of Detroit, Michigan, on May 31, 1937. Upon arriving in Detroit, he was greeted by Governor Frank Murphy and a representative of Mayor Frank Couzens. An advocate for labor unions, he once proposed establishing parish labor schools in order to help "Christian workers to train themselves in principle and technique to assume the leadership in the unions which their numbers justify".

From the very beginning of his tenure in Detroit, Mooney became engaged in a contentious relationship with Fr. Charles Coughlin, whose controversial radio broadcasts had angered many in the Catholic hierarchy and American public. In October 1937, he rebuked Coughlin for casting aspersions on President Franklin Delano Roosevelt's sanity over his nomination of Hugo Black to the Supreme Court, leading Coughlin to cancel his contract for twenty-six radio broadcasts. After the priest agreed to end his program in 1942, Mooney responded, "My understanding with him is sufficiently broad and firm to exclude effectively the recurrence of any such unpleasant situation."

As the population of Detroit grew into the northern suburbs of Detroit, Mooney added churches in the remote areas of Oakland County. He appointed Father Frederick Delaney to begin opening additional parishes in the rural areas of the county.

During World War II, Mooney was staunchly opposed to Nazi Germany, once stating before a group of North and South American prelates, "A victory in this war for the forces of Nazi-inspired aggression would drive Christians underground for generations in the conquered countries." Pope Pius XII created him Cardinal Priest of Santa Susanna in the consistory of February 18, 1946.

In 1957, Mooney delivered the benediction at the second inauguration of President Dwight D. Eisenhower.
 
The cardinal died in Rome, at age 76, after suffering from a heart attack and collapsing less than three hours before the beginning of the 1958 papal conclave. Cardinals Francis Spellman and James McIntyre granted him absolution before departing for the conclave. Mooney was initially buried in the crypt of St. John's Provincial Seminary in Plymouth, but his remains were later transferred in 1988 to Holy Sepulchre Cemetery in Southfield.

Legacy
Cardinal Mooney High School in Youngstown, Ohio, is named after him. It is not far from where he spent his childhood. A former Cardinal Mooney High School in Greece, New York, a suburb of Rochester, closed in 1989. Other current Cardinal Mooney High Schools exist in Marine City, Michigan, and Sarasota, Florida.

References

External links

‘Heavy hitter’ Cardinal Mooney helped shape new archdiocese 
Letter to Ambassador Myron C. Taylor

1882 births
1958 deaths
20th-century American cardinals
Burials in Michigan
Cardinals created by Pope Pius XII
People from Youngstown, Ohio
Roman Catholic Diocese of Cleveland
Pontifical Urban University alumni
Apostolic Nuncios to Japan
Apostolic Nuncios to India
Roman Catholic archbishops of Detroit
Roman Catholic Diocese of Rochester
St. Charles College alumni
St. Mary's Seminary and University alumni
People from Mount Savage, Maryland
Religious leaders from New York (state)
Catholics from Ohio
Catholics from Maryland
Knights of Peter Claver & Ladies Auxiliary